Lower Philipstown is a barony in County Offaly (formerly King's County), Republic of Ireland.

Etymology
The name Lower Philipstown is derived from Philipstown, the former name of Daingean.

Location

Lower Philipstown is located in northeast County Offaly and contains Croghan Hill and part of the Bog of Allen.

History
Lower Philipstown was roughly formed from the ancient tuaths; Tuath Rátha Droma and Tuath Cruacháin of the Uí Failge (O'Connor Faly). Ó hAonghusa (O'Hennessy) alongside Ó hUallacháin (O'Houlihan) are cited here as chiefs of Clan Colgan, near Croghan Hill.
 The original Philipstown barony was split into upper and lower by 1807.

List of settlements

Below is a list of settlements in Lower Philipstown:
Croghan
 Daingean

References

Baronies of County Offaly